Norbert Gastell (14 October 1929 – 26 November 2015) was a German actor and voice actor who specialized in dubbing. He was born to German parents, but grew up in Argentina. He moved to Munich in 1938.

Gastell was best known in Germany as the voice of Homer Simpson in the German version of The Simpsons, which he provided since the series was first aired in 1991 until his death. He is also remembered for dubbing the character Trevor Ochmonek in the sitcom ALF, Coach Pantusso in Cheers and Cornelius Fudge in the Harry Potter films. He was also active in radio plays.

He died in Munich at the age of 86.

Partial filmography 

1962: Dicke Luft – Barkeeper #2 (uncredited)
1963: The Pirates of the Mississippi – Barkeeper Roy (voice, uncredited)
1963-1966: Kommissar Freytag – Herr Werner / Schrimm / Herr Müller
1965: Die Letzten drei der Albatross – Captain (voice, uncredited)
1966: Der Mörder mit dem Seidenschal – Polizeibewacher Claudias (voice, uncredited)
1966: Raumpatrouille (TV Series) – Hydra-Offizier / Hydra-Bordingenieur
1967:  (TV Mini-Series) – 2. Wachtmeister
1968-1980: Aktenzeichen XY… ungelöst (TV Series) – Kriminalkommissar in Passau
1971: My Father, the Ape and I – Kriminalbeamter (voice, uncredited)
1971: Operation Walküre (TV Movie) – Fritz Thiele
1972: Die rote Kapelle (TV Mini-Series) – Feldwebel Traxl
1972: The Stuff That Dreams Are Made Of – Chefredakteur Lester (voice, uncredited)
1973: The Bloody Vultures of Alaska – Achua-hua (voice, uncredited)
1974: Mordkommission (TV Series) – Markus Behn
1974: Ach jodel mir noch einen – Stosstrupp Venus bläst zum Angriff – Karl (voice, uncredited)
1975: Das verrückteste Auto der Welt – Mr. Brown II (voice, uncredited)
1978: SOKO 5113 (TV Series)
1979:  – Vater (voice)
1979: Der Millionenbauer (TV Series) – Chefarzt
1980: Merlin (TV Series) – Sir Lark
1981: Ein Kaktus ist kein Lutschbonbon – Jesus (voice)
1981: Die Todesgöttin des Liebescamps – Inspector (voice, uncredited)
1984: Die Wiesingers (TV Series)
19851993: Tatort (TV Series) – Stadtrat Völk
1988: Betrayed – (German version)
1989: Löwengrube (TV Series) – Bezirksamtsmann
1989-2006: Forsthaus Falkenau – Herr Leonhard alias Herr Schwarz
1991: Go Trabi Go – Narrator – Notfallsäule (voice, uncredited)
1991: Success – Direktor des Deutschen Museums
1994: Mutter, ich will nicht sterben! (TV Movie) – Arzt
1995:  (TV miniseries)
2001: Samt und Seide'' (TV Series) – Pfarrer

References

External links 
 
 Norbert Gastell at the Deutsche Synchronkartei

1929 births
2015 deaths
People from Buenos Aires
German male film actors
German male television actors
German male voice actors